José Coleto Airport  is the airport serving Ji-Paraná, Brazil.

Airlines and destinations

Access

See also

List of airports in Brazil

References

External links

Airports in Rondônia
airport